Common Sense, subtitled A New Constitution for Britain is a book written by the British Labour politician Tony Benn and Andrew Hood.

Cause
The book was written after the first reading in the House of Commons of the United Kingdom of Benn's Commonwealth of Britain Bill in 1991. It includes the full text of the bill as an appendix. The main content of the book discusses the reasoning behind the bill. Benn wrote an article, summarising the book's contents, published in Keith Sutherland's book The Rape of the Constitution? (2000).

The bill proposed establishing the United Kingdom as a secular state and thus disestablishing the Church of England, removing the British Crown as an element of government, but continuing government with democratically elected members from constituencies, each seat electing a male and a female. Various other reforms were proposed along liberal lines, such as a single age of consent, abolition of blasphemy laws, and equal rights in law for homosexuals.

The introduction of the bill was intended more for public discussion than with any real hope that it would become law.

Editions

See also
Tony Benn
Disestablishmentarianism
Labour for a Republic
Republic (political organisation)

References

External links
 Common sense: a new constitution for Britain
1993 in politics
1993 in the United Kingdom
1993 non-fiction books
Age of consent
Blasphemy law
Books about politics of the United Kingdom
Church of England
Hutchinson (publisher) books
LGBT rights in the United Kingdom
Political manifestos
Republicanism in the United Kingdom
Secularism
Separation of church and state
Tony Benn